Pasifika may refer to:
Pacific Islander people, indigenous peoples of the Pacific Islands
Pasifika New Zealanders, Pacific peoples living in New Zealand
Pacific islands, including Melanesia, Micronesia and Polynesia
The Pasifika Festival, an annual festival held in Auckland, New Zealand

See also
Arts Pasifika Awards, New Zealand
Pacifica (disambiguation)
Pacifika, a Canadian world music band
Urban Pasifika, a style of Polynesian hip hop music